This list of 2013 NFL draft early entrants consists of college football players who were juniors or redshirt sophomores and were accepted by the National Football League (NFL) as eligible to be selected in the 2013 NFL draft. A college football player who completed high school at least three years prior can renounce his remaining NCAA eligibility and enter the draft. Players who met these requirements had until January 15, 2013, to declare their intention to forgo their remaining collegiate eligibility.
A total of 73 underclassmen were granted eligibility for the 2013 draft, eclipsing the previous record from 2012 of 65. In addition to these underclassmen, at least six players who were considered seniors opted not to pursue an additional season of college eligibility for which they may have been eligible.

Complete list of players
The following players were granted special eligibility to enter the 2013 draft:

 Notes
 This player was a third-year sophomore.
 This player was not technically an underclassman, but he opted to forego a potential additional season of college eligibility.

Number of players granted special eligibility by year
Undergraduates admitted to the NFL draft each year:

References

External links 
 2013 NFL Draft

Lists of National Football League Draft early entrants
Draft early entrants
NFL draft early entrants